Robertsdale may refer to:

Robertsdale, Alabama
Robertsdale, Pennsylvania
Robertsdale Historic District
Robertsdale (Hammond)
Robertsdale High School